Robert Arter (born September 7, 1929) is a retired United States Army lieutenant general and former commanding general of the Sixth United States Army.

Born and raised in Massillon, Ohio, Arter graduated from Washington High School in 1946. He was commissioned a second lieutenant of Infantry from Ohio University in 1950 after completing a B.S. degree in personnel management. Arter later earned an M.S. degree in public administration from Shippensburg State College.

In 1952, Arter served with the 35th Regimental Combat Team, 25th Infantry Division, in Korea. From 1956 to 1960, after attending the Infantry Officer Advanced Course, he was assigned as an operations officer for the Infantry School. Upon completion of the United States Air Force Air Command and Staff College in 1962, he held numerous command and staff positions before being sent to the Republic of Vietnam. In 1968, he assumed command of the 1st Battalion, 506th Airborne Infantry Regiment, 101st Airborne Division (Airmobile). He returned to Vietnam in 1971 to command the 1st Brigade, 101st Airborne Division.

Arter was promoted to brigadier general in 1973 and became the Commanding General of the Third ROTC Region. From 1975 to 1979, he was the Deputy Commanding General, United States Training Center and Fort Ord; Assistant Division Commander, 7th Infantry Division; and Deputy Commandant, United States Army Command and General Staff College. In 1979, Arter was promoted to major general and named Commanding General, United States Army Military District of Washington, followed by Commanding General, United States Army Military Personnel Center. Arter's last assignment was as Commanding General, Sixth United States Army.

Awards and decorations

Gen Arter was inducted in the inaugural class of the Phi Kappa Tau Hall of Fame and is a member of the Beta Chapter of Phi Kappa Tau's Hall of Fame at Ohio University.

Retirement
In 1991, Arter briefly held the position of Superintendent of Wentworth Military Academy. He served as President and CEO of the Armed Forces Bank in Fort Leavenworth, Kansas for a number of years and remains as a member of the board. In February 2006, he was named as a civilian aide to the Secretary of the Army for Kansas. In addition, Arter serves on the Governor’s Military Council for the state of Kansas.

References

External links
 Robert Arter, Phi Kappa Tau.

1929 births
Living people
People from Massillon, Ohio
Ohio University alumni
United States Army personnel of the Korean War
Shippensburg University of Pennsylvania alumni
United States Army personnel of the Vietnam War
Recipients of the Air Medal
Recipients of the Distinguished Flying Cross (United States)
Recipients of the Silver Star
Recipients of the Legion of Merit
United States Army generals
Recipients of the Distinguished Service Medal (US Army)
Presidents of Wentworth Military Academy and College
People from Leavenworth County, Kansas